Winters High School may refer to:
Winters High School (California) in Winters, California
Winters High School (Texas) in Winters, Texas